Piz Cazarauls is a 3,063-m high mountain in the Glarus Alps in Switzerland. The summit is the tripoint between the cantons of Uri, Glarus and Graubünden. Piz Cazarauls lies between the valleys of Maderanertal, Linth and Val Russein.

References

External links
 Piz Cazarauls on Hikr

Mountains of Switzerland
Mountains of the Alps
Alpine three-thousanders
Mountains of the canton of Glarus
Mountains of the canton of Uri
Mountains of Graubünden
Graubünden–Uri border
Glarus–Graubünden border
Glarus–Uri border
Disentis